Lawrence Fonka Shang was President of the National Assembly of Cameroon from 1988 to 1992. He succeeded Salomon Tandeng Muna and was succeeded by Cavayé Yéguié Djibril. He was Anglophone Cameroonian.

References

Cameroonian politicians
Presidents of the National Assembly (Cameroon)
1992 deaths
Year of birth missing